Neohodgsonia is a genus of liverworts containing the single species Neohodgsonia mirabilis. Neohodgsonia is the only genus in the family Neohodgsoniaceae, which is the only family in the order Neohodgsoniales.

References 

Liverwort genera
Monotypic bryophyte genera
Liverworts